Louis René Fernand Gallois (born 26 January 1944) is a French businessman. He was the CEO of EADS, the European aeronautic defense and space company, from 2007 to 2012.

Education
Gallois was raised in Montauban, where he received his Baccalauréat in 1961. After two years of a well-known private prépa school, Sainte-Geneviève, he attended business school at HEC Paris, a Grande école, graduating in 1966.  He then went on to ÉNA, one of the most prestigious grandes écoles, graduating in 1972.

Career
Gallois headed several government departments during his career. He was appointed head of the civil and military cabinet in the French defense ministry (1988–1989).  He was chairman and CEO of Snecma, an aircraft and rocket engine manufacturer, from 1989 to 1992, when he became CEO of Aérospatiale, a French state-owned aviation company.  He headed that company until 1996, when he became President of SNCF, France's national state-owned railway company.

Gallois joined EADS on 2 July 2006 following the resignation of Noël Forgeard. Forgeard resigned after allegations of insider trading, which he denied. Forgeard had sold EADS stock weeks before its Airbus subsidiary announced that the Airbus A380 would be delayed again. The announcement caused a 26% slump in the EADS share price.

On 9 October 2006 Gallois replaced Christian Streiff as the CEO of the aircraft manufacturer Airbus S.A.S. On 16 July 2007 EADS's management structure was changed and Gallois was appointed CEO of EADS for 5 years. He was replaced on 31 May 2012 by the then CEO of Airbus, Tom Enders.

Gallois is a member of the board of directors of École Centrale Paris and President of the Fondation Villette-Entreprises.

In 2012, immediately after leaving EADS, Gallois became the government's Commissioner for Investment.
He held his position until 2014.

He is elected in June 2012 president of the FNARS (Fédération nationale des associations d'accueil et de réinsertion sociale), a group focusing on social and solidarity actions.

References

1944 births
Living people
HEC Paris alumni
École nationale d'administration alumni
French chief executives
French rail transport chief executives
People from Montauban
Airbus people
SNCF people
Grand Officiers of the Légion d'honneur
Honorary Knights Commander of the Order of the British Empire